Marion County is a county located in the U.S. state of Mississippi. As of the 2020 census, the population was 24,441. Its county seat is Columbia. Marion County is named for American Revolutionary War guerrilla leader Francis Marion also known  as The Swamp Fox.

Geography

Major highways
  U.S. Highway 98
  Mississippi Highway 13
  Mississippi Highway 35
  Mississippi Highway 43
  Mississippi Highway 44

Adjacent counties
 Jefferson Davis County (north)
 Lamar County (east)
 Pearl River County (southeast)
 Washington Parish, Louisiana (south)
 Walthall County (west)
 Lawrence County (northwest)

Demographics

2020 census

As of the 2020 United States census, there were 24,441 people, 9,483 households, and 5,863 families residing in the county.

2000 census
As of the census of 2000, there were 25,595 people, 9,336 households, and 6,880 families residing in the county.  The population density was 47 people per square mile (18/km2). There were 10,395 housing units at an average density of 19 per square mile (7/km2). The racial makeup of the county was 66.96% White, 31.87% Black or African American, 0.23% Native American, 0.21% Asian, 0.01% Pacific Islander, 0.11% from other races, and 0.62% from two or more races. 0.62% of the  population were Hispanic or Latino of any race.

There were 9,336 households, out of which 34.80% had children under the age of 18 living with them, 54.00% were married couples living together, 15.60% had a female  householder with no husband present, and 26.30% were non-families. 24.20% of all households were made up of individuals, and 12.60% had someone living alone who was 65 years of age or older. The average household size was 2.64 and the average family size was 3.13.

In the county, the population was spread out, with 27.80% under the age of 18, 9.50% from 18 to 24, 26.90% from 25 to 44, 21.50% from 45 to 64, and 14.30% who were 65 years of age or older.  The median age was 35 years. For every 100 females there were 93.70 males. For every 100 females age 18 and over, there were 88.80 males.

The median income for a household in the county was $24,555, and the median income for a  family was $29,894. Males had a median income of $26,909 versus $17,192 for females. The per capita income for the county was $12,301. About 20.70% of families and 24.80% of the population were below the poverty line, including 32.60% of those under age 18 and 23.00% of those aged 65 or over.

Government and infrastructure
The Mississippi Department of Human Services's Division of Youth Services operated the Columbia Training School in unincorporated Marion County. The facility was closed in 2008.

Communities

Cities
 Columbia (county seat & only incorporated place)

Census-designated places
 Foxworth
 Kokomo

Unincorporated communities

 Bunker Hill
 Cheraw
 East Columbia
 Goss
 Hub
 Improve
 Jamestown
 Morgantown
 Sandy Hook
 New Hope
 Rosehill
 Foxworth

Notable people
 Earl W. Bascom (1906–1995), "Father of Modern Rodeo," Mississippi Rodeo Hall of Fame inductee, producer of Marion County's first rodeo in 1935
 Charles C. Bass (1875–1975), "Father of Preventive Dentistry"; researcher in tropical medicine
 Charles Coleman (American football) (born 1963), American football player
 Logan Cooke - NFL punter
 Peggy Dow, American actress
 Walter Payton, American football player

See also

 National Register of Historic Places listings in Marion County, Mississippi

References

External links
 Marion County Sheriff's Office
 Official website of Marion County

 
Mississippi counties
1811 establishments in Mississippi Territory
Populated places established in 1811